Tryin' Like The Devil is the second album by the country singer-songwriter James Talley. It was recorded at Jack Clement Studio B in Nashville, Tennessee.

Critical reception 
Reviewing in Christgau's Record Guide: Rock Albums of the Seventies (1981), Robert Christgau wrote: "Something about this record as a whole is slightly off—maybe it's Talley's humorlessness, or maybe it's that his voice is much better suited to the startling talky intimacy of his first record than to the belting bravado with which he asserts his ambitions this time. But every song works individually, and an audacious concept—returning a consciously leftish analysis to the right-leaning populism of country music—is damn near realized in utterly idiomatic songs like '40 Hours' and 'Are They Gonna Make Us Outlaws Again?' It belts good enough."

Track listing
"Forty Hours" (Talley) – 3:05
"Deep Country Blues" (Talley) – 4:30
"Give My Love to Marie" (Talley) – 3:43
"Are They Gonna Make Us Outlaws Again" (Talley) – 3:18
"She Tries Not to Cry" (Talley) – 4:11
"Tryin' Like The Devil" (Talley) – 2:21
"She's the One" (Talley) – 4:17
"Sometimes I Think About Suzanne" (Talley) – 3:29
"Nuthin' But the Blues" (Talley) – 3:07
"You Can't Ever Tell" (Talley) – 2:45

Personnel
James Talley – Acoustic Guitar, Lead Vocals
Doyle Grisham – Steel Guitar, Electric Guitar, Acoustic Guitar, Dobro
Johnny Gimble – Fiddle, Mandolin
Josh Graves – Dobro
Charlie McCoy – Harmonica
Steve Blailock – Electric Guitar, Acoustic Guitar
Jerry Shook – Acoustic Guitar, Harmonica
Rick Durrett – Piano, Electric Piano
Steve Mendell – Bass, Background Vocals
Mike Leech – Bass
Karl Himmel – Drums, Percussion
Chris Laird – Drums
Dave Gillon – Acoustic Guitar
Steve Gillon – Background Vocals
John Bell – Background Vocals
Steve Mendell – Background Vocals
Jim Rooney – Background Vocals

Production
Producer: James Talley/Stephen Mendell
Recording/Mixing Engineer: Lee Hazen/Jim Williamson
Mastering: Jay Maynard
Photography: Clark Thomas
Art Direction: Roy Kohara

References 

James Talley albums
1976 albums